Westmount Shopping Centre, also referred to as Westmount Mall or Westmount Commons, is a shopping centre located in London, Ontario. It is located at 785 Wonderland Road South at the northwest corner of Wonderland Road and Viscount Road.

History

Westmount Mall's first phase opened initially in 1971 with 15 stores, including a Dominion grocery store as the anchor.

In 1973, the mall expanded, adding about 50 additional retailers, with Horizon as the main anchor. It was at that time the largest mall in Southwestern Ontario.

In 1978, Horizon was closed and converted into an Eaton's department store.

Expansion
The mall was completely rebuilt as a two-storey mall, with underground parking and over 160 retailers. Construction began in 1987 and was finished in 1989.

By 1999, Eaton's was closed due to bankruptcy and converted into a Sears department store.

In the early 2000s, a bus stop was added by the London Transit Commission, which serviced the following routes: 7, 10, 15A, 15B and 24.

Downturn

By the early 2000s, Westmount's fortunes experienced a slump. The vacancy rate in the mall took a sharp increase as 40 stores slowly left the mall.

Future

In 2018, following the closure of Westmount's department store anchor, Sears Canada, the mall was bought for $31.5 million by a Toronto real estate investment firm. KingSett Capital, with partner McCOR Management, purchased the property from Penretail Management in February. The firm has planned to re-brand the mall and announce new anchor tenants and mixed-use developments.

In September 2018, an announcement regarding the former Target store was made, indicating it would be converted to both a "Fit 4 Less" (GoodLife Fitness) gym and office spaces.

References

1971 establishments in Ontario
Buildings and structures in London, Ontario
Shopping malls in Ontario
Shopping malls established in 1971
Tourist attractions in London, Ontario